Following is a list of notable painters from the Dominican Republic.

Cándido Bidó
Jaime Colson
Luis Desangles
Paul Giudicelli
Gilberto Hernández Ortega
Clara Ledesma
Yoryi Morel
Olivia Peguero
Guillo Pérez
Eligio Pichardo
Darío Suro
Abelardo Rodríguez Urdaneta
Miguel Vila Luna
Celeste Woss y Gil

See also

 Culture of the Dominican Republic
 List of lists of painters by nationality
 List of people from the Dominican Republic

 
Painters
Dominican Repbulic